NSS-9 is a communications satellite owned by SES WORLD SKIES. It is an all C-band satellite intended as a replacement for NSS-5, and has three beams with 44 active C-band transponders.

NSS-9 was built by Orbital Sciences Corporation and launched February 12, 2009 aboard Ariane 5 flight V-187.

Built on the Orbital STAR-2 satellite bus, NSS-9 has an expected useful lifetime extending through 2024.

Its launch has been featured in National Geographic Channel's programme World's Toughest Fixes Satellite Launch S02E01.

References

External links

 http://www.ses.com/4629118/nss-9

Communications satellites in geostationary orbit
Spacecraft launched in 2009
SES satellites
Satellites using the GEOStar bus